Lesley Smither (born 12 March 1958) is a British sprint canoer who competed in the early to mid-1980s. Competing in two Summer Olympics, she earned her best finish of seventh in the K-4 500 m event at Los Angeles in 1984.

References
Sports-Reference.com profile

1958 births
British female canoeists
Canoeists at the 1980 Summer Olympics
Canoeists at the 1984 Summer Olympics
Living people
Olympic canoeists of Great Britain